Bronisław Emil Cieślak (8 October 1943 – 2 May 2021) was a Polish actor, journalist, media presenter and politician. He was born in Kraków.

He was best known for his role as Sławomir Borewicz, the main hero of a popular Polish TV series 07 zgłoś się (filmed in the 1970s and 1980s).

He was a deputy to Polish parliament (Sejm) from 1997 to 2005 as a member of the Democratic Left Alliance party.

Honours 
 Silver Medal for Merit to Culture – Gloria Artis

References

1943 births
2021 deaths
20th-century Polish male actors
Members of the Polish Sejm 1997–2001
Members of the Polish Sejm 2001–2005
Politicians from Kraków
Male actors from Kraków
Polish male television actors
Polish United Workers' Party members
Recipients of the Silver Medal for Merit to Culture – Gloria Artis
Democratic Left Alliance politicians
Polish actor-politicians